In Greek mythology, Diaphorus was a judge who sailed to Troy with the Achaeans.

Note

Reference 

 Gaius Julius Hyginus, Fabulae from The Myths of Hyginus translated and edited by Mary Grant. University of Kansas Publications in Humanistic Studies. Online version at the Topos Text Project.

Characters in Greek mythology